Malaga Naval Base is a Naval Base located halfway along the Pacific Coastline of Colombia, strategically located to combat drug trafficking. It is used by both Colombian Naval Infantry and the United States Marines under a defence agreement.

References

Military installations of Colombia